Thomas Dynt or Dent (fl. 1414) of Wells, Somerset, was an English politician.

He was a Member (MP) of the Parliament of England for Wells in April 1414 and November 1414. He was pledged by another Wells MP, John Wycombe.

References

14th-century births
15th-century deaths
English MPs April 1414
People from Wells, Somerset
English MPs November 1414